= Pirahati =

Town in Rajshahi, Bangladesh

Coordinates: 24°06′24″N 89°27′11″E

Pirahati (Bengali: পিড়াহাটী) is a town located in the division of Rajshahi in Bangladesh.
